The Digital Television Transition and Public Safety Act of 2005 is a United States Congress legislation enacted on October 20, 2005.  This act deals with the cessation of the broadcasting of analog television and the subsequent implementation of digital television.  This transition took place on June 12, 2009, which had been scheduled for February 17, 2009.

Introduction
The act was a part of the Deficit Reduction Act of 2005 (S.1932), Title III. It also provided for an auction of the recovered frequencies, and for a sum of $7.3 billion to be transferred to the U.S. Treasury from the money received.

Digital-analog converter box coupon program
Each American household was able to request up to two coupons worth $40 to facilitate the purchase of digital-analog converter boxes.  These requests for coupons could be submitted between the dates January 1, 2008 and March 31, 2009, inclusive.

See also
Digital cable
Digital television

References

External links
Site dealing with digital television and the impending switch from analog
PDF version of the Digital Transition and Public Safety Act

United States federal communications legislation